Girl Talk is the fourth studio album by American singer Lesley Gore. The album, released in 1964, spawned several hit singles, including "Maybe I Know," "Hey Now," and "Look of Love". The album reached number 146 on the Billboard 200.

Commercial performance
The album was less successful than its predecessors, stalling at number 146 on the US album chart. It did include two Top 40 hits, however: "Maybe I Know" and "Look of Love." "Maybe I Know" was also a Top 20 hit in the UK.

Critical reception
Retrospectively, AllMusic awarded the album three-and-a-half stars, and though commenting that the singles are the highlights, concluded that the album is "certainly one of her better" albums.

Track listing

References

1964 albums
Lesley Gore albums
Albums produced by Quincy Jones
Mercury Records albums